Bill Denver (June 12, 1901 – May 28, 1933) was an American racecar driver.  He and his riding mechanic, Bob Hurst, died from injuries sustained during a qualification run for the 1933 Indianapolis 500.

Indianapolis 500 results

See also
List of fatalities at the Indianapolis Motor Speedway

References

External links

Year of birth unknown
1933 deaths
People from Ravenswood, West Virginia
Racing drivers from West Virginia
Indianapolis 500 drivers
AAA Championship Car drivers
Racing drivers who died while racing
Sports deaths in Indiana